Tabernaemontana ventricosa (commonly known as forest toad-tree or small-fruited toad-tree) is a plant in the family Apocynaceae. Leaves are paired (set opposite each other) and crowded near the ends of branches. They are oblong, leathery and a glossy dark green. Flowers are fragrant with white, somewhat twisted lobes, often with a pale yellow center and are set in small clusters at the ends of branches. Its habitat is forests from sea level to  altitude. In Zimbabwe, it is usually found as part of the understorey of evergreen forests. Local medicinal uses include the treatment of wounds, fever and hypertension. The plant is native to tropical central and southern Africa.

References

ventricosa
Plants described in 1844
Plants used in traditional African medicine
Flora of Africa